Shuikou is a town under the jurisdiction of Xingning City, Meizhou, in eastern Guangdong Province, China.

References 

Xingning, Guangdong
Township-level divisions of Guangdong